Ike Walton Lake is a 1,417 acre lake in Vilas County, Wisconsin. The fish present in the lake are Muskellunge, Panfish, Largemouth Bass, Smallmouth Bass, and Walleye. There is one boat ramp in a small bay on the western shore.

See also 
 List of lakes in Wisconsin
 List of lakes in Vilas County, Wisconsin

References

Lakes of Wisconsin
Lakes of Vilas County, Wisconsin